Vytautas Augustauskas-Augustaitis (since 1939 Augustaitis; April 9, 1904 – June 27, 1958) was a Lithuanian educator, scientist, sports organizer, and one of the Lithuanian physical education system creators.

References

1904 births
1958 deaths
20th-century Lithuanian people
Lithuanian educators
Lithuanian sportsmen
20th-century Lithuanian educators
Burials at Petrašiūnai Cemetery